Kalleh Sur-e Shabliz (also Romanized as Kalleh Sūr-e Shablīz; also known as Kalleh Sūr) is a village in Pataveh Rural District, Pataveh District, Dana County, Kohgiluyeh and Boyer-Ahmad Province, Iran. At the 2006 census, its population was 61, in 12 families.

References 

Populated places in Dana County